Thailand competed at the  2013 Asian Indoor and Martial Arts Games in Incheon, South Korea  from June 29, 2013 to July 6, 2013. 
Thailand finished with a total of 8 gold medals, 3 silver medals, and 11 bronze medals.

Medal summary

Medals table

Medalists 

Nations at the 2013 Asian Indoor and Martial Arts Games
2013 in Thai sport
Thailand at the Asian Indoor Games